The 107th Anti-Aircraft Artillery Division of Air Defense Force() was activated in Nanjing, Jiangsu province on September 1, 1955.

The division was then a part of the People's Liberation Army Air Defense Force. 
The division was then composed of:
507th Anti-Aircraft Artillery Regiment
522nd Anti-Aircraft Artillery Regiment
321st Anti-Aircraft Radar Regiment

On July 1, 1956, the division was transferred under the 1st Air Defense Force Corps' control.

In May 1957, the 522nd AAA Regiment was transferred to the 106th Anti-Aircraft Artillery Division's control, the 507th AAA Regiment was transferred to the 101st Anti-Aircraft Artillery Division's control, and the 321st Radar Regiment detached from the division to directly subordinated to the Air Defense Force of Nanjing Military Region.

The now-stripped-up division headquarters moved to Shenyang, Liaoning and was transferred to the People's Liberation Army Air Force in June 1957. 

On July 1, 1957, the 501st AAA Regiment in Laguta, 505rd AAA Regiment in Xiaofengman, and the 509th AAA Regiment in Shenyang joined the division. In September, following the merge of the Air Force and the Air Defense Force, the division was formally redesignated as the 107th Anti-Aircraft Artillery Division of Air Force().

On July 19, 1958, the 402nd Searchlight Regiment joined the division.

In March 1960, the 4th Independent Anti-Aircraft Artillery Battalion was activated.

On March 1, 1964, the division was redesignated as the 6th Anti-Aircraft Artillery Division of Air Force(). The 503rd, 521st, and 527th regiments were redesignated as the 16th, 2nd, and 18th Anti-Aircraft Artillery Regiments, respectively. The 402nd Searchlight Regiment was redesignated as the 5th Searchlight Regiment.

By then the division was composed of:
2nd Anti-Aircraft Artillery Regiment
16th Anti-Aircraft Artillery Regiment
18th Anti-Aircraft Artillery Regiment
5th Searchlight Regiment
4th Independent Anti-Aircraft Artillery Battalion

In December 1964, the division exchanged its 2nd AAA Regiment with the 3rd AAA Regiment from the [[1st Antiaircraft Artillery Division of Air Force (People's Republic of China)|1st Antiaircraft Artillery Division of Air Force].

In July 1969, the 17th Anti-Aircraft Artillery Regiment was activated. The 4th Independent AAA Battalion merged into the 17th AAA Regiment as its 3rd battalion.

In April 1975, the 5th Searchlight Regiment was disbanded.

On February 23, 1976, the 17th Anti-Aircraft Artillery Regiment detached from the division and reorganized as the 19th Surface-to-Air Missile Regiment. The 36th AAA Regiment joined the division and was redesignated as the 17th Anti-Aircraft Artillery Regiment at the same time.

In September 1985, the division combined with the 18th Surface-to-Air Missile Regiment and reorganized into the 6th Composite Air Defense Brigade of Air Force().

In December 1993 the brigade was disbanded.

References
沈空高炮第6师, http://www.miss81.com/new_view.aspx?id=21

Air defence divisions
Military units and formations established in 1955
Military units and formations disestablished in 1994
1955 establishments in China